Banswari is a village in Jhadol Tehsil in Udaipur district in the Indian state of Rajasthan. It is administrated by Sarpanch (Head of Village) who is elected representative of village.

Education
The literacy rate of Banswari village is low and as per 2011 census it was 52.92% compared to 66.11% of Rajasthan.

References

Villages in Udaipur district